Saint-Congard is a commune in the Morbihan department of Brittany in north-western France. Inhabitants of Saint-Congard are called in French Saint-Congardais.

See also
Communes of the Morbihan department

References

External links

 Mayors of Morbihan Association 

Saintcongard